Palaeoloxodon falconeri is an extinct species of dwarf elephant from the Middle Pleistocene of Sicily and Malta. It is amongst the smallest of all dwarf elephants at only one metre in height. A member of the genus Palaeoloxodon, it derived from a population of the mainland European straight-tusked elephant (Palaeoloxodon antiquus).

Chronology 
Palaeoloxodon falconeri derives from the 4 metre tall straight-tusked elephant (P. antiquus), which arrived in Europe approximately 800,000 years ago. The oldest radiometrically dated fossils of Palaeoloxodon on Sicily date to around 500,000 years ago while the ones found in Għar Dalam on Malta date to around 450,000 years ago. P. falconeri'''s ancestors most likely reached Sicily from the Italian mainland, likely via a series of islands that now form part of the southern Calabrian peninsula. It is generally thought that P. falconeri is the earlier species dating to the Middle Pleistocene, and that P. mnaidriensis descends from a separate late Middle Pleistocene colonisation of the island by P. antiquus. P. falconeri also occurs on Malta, but is generally shorter making it a possible subspecies. It likely dispersed to Malta from Sicily during episodes of low sea level.

Taxonomy
In 1867, George Busk had proposed the species Elephas falconeri for many of the smallest molars selected from the material originally ascribed by Hugh Falconer to Palaeoloxodon melitensis for the Maltese dwarf elephant, a possible subspecies of P. falconeri.Palombo, M.R. (2001). Endemic elephants of the Mediterranean Islands: knowledge, problems and perspectives. The World of Elephants, Proceedings of the 1st International Congress (October 16–20, 2001, Rome): 486–491. The species Elephas/Palaeoloxodon melitensis, formerly considered a distinct species, is now considered a synonym of P. falconeri.Description

This island-bound elephant is considered to be an example of insular dwarfism. A newborn male of the species was estimated in the same study to weigh . Female members of the species were tuskless. Histology demonstrates that despite their small size, individuals of P. falconeri grew very slowly, reaching maturity at around 15 years of age, with some individuals reaching a lifespan of 68 years, comparable to full-sized elephants. Dental microwear suggests that P. falconeri was a mixed feeder (both browsing and grazing).

 Paleoenvironment 
Sicily and Malta during the time of P. falconeri exhibited a depauperate fauna, with the only other mammal species on the islands being the cat-sized giant dormouse Leithia as well as the giant dormouse Maltamys, the otter Nesolutra, and an extinct species of shrew belonging to Crocidura.''

Gallery

See also

 Dwarf elephant

References

Palaeoloxodon
Pleistocene proboscideans
Pleistocene species
Fossil taxa described in 1867
Pleistocene mammals of Europe
Archaeological discoveries in Malta